"Drivin' My Life Away" is a song co-written and recorded by American country music artist Eddie Rabbitt.  It was released in June 1980 as the first single from the album Horizon.  The song was written by Rabbitt, Even Stevens and David Malloy.

Background
The song is a look into the life of a truck driver and the long periods of time they spend away from home.

Commercial performance
Although many of Rabbitt's successful songs were country-pop material, "Drivin' My Life Away" began his peak popularity as a crossover artist. The song peaked at No. 5 on the Billboard Hot 100, and set the stage for his biggest career hit: "I Love a Rainy Night," which reached the top on the country, Hot 100 and adult contemporary charts in early 1981. Two more crossover hits - "Step by Step" and "You and I" (the latter a duet with Crystal Gayle) - followed in 1981 and 1982.

On Billboard's Hot Country Singles chart, it was his seventh out of 17 career chart toppers, spanning from 1976 through 1990.

In 1981, "Drivin' My Life Away" was certified gold for sales of half a million units by the Recording Industry Association of America. It has also sold a further 267,000 digital copies in the US since it became available for download.

Uses in media
It was featured on the soundtrack of the 1980 movie Roadie starring Meat Loaf and Art Carney.
The song was covered in Kidsongs' 1987 video: What I Want to Be.
The song was covered in the 1987 Episode "Cup A' Joe" from The A-Team (season 3).
The song was featured in the 2016 film Everybody Wants Some!! at a scene which takes place at a Texas country bar.
The song is featured in a 2016 TV commercial for the Volkswagen Golf.
In Eddie Rabbitt's  1990 country hit "Running with the Wind" he mentions the 1980 crossover hit "Drivin' My Life Away" with the following lyric:  I listen to the windshield wipers go/Just like the song I used to know/I'm drivin' my life away, hey/Drivin' my life away.
The song is featured in the 2018 program The Americans, season 6, episode 4, during a line dancing scene.
The song is featured at the beginning and at the end of the 2018 film Finding Steve McQueen.

Charts
"Drivin' My Life Away" was released in 1980 as the first single from his album Horizon.  It reached number one on the Hot Country Singles in 1980, and peaked at No. 5 on the Billboard Hot 100.

Rhett Akins cover

In 1998, country music artist Rhett Akins recorded a cover version of this song for the soundtrack to the 1998 film Black Dog. This cover, released with Lee Ann Womack's "A Man with 18 Wheels" on the B-side, peaked at number 56 on the country music charts.

Akins told Billboard that he was "apprehensive" about recording the song because of the familiarity of Rabbitt's original version. He also said that he wanted to record the song "the way I want to do it", but also that he wanted it to fit with the tone of the movie. As he did not know what the movie was going to be about, he consulted its director, Kevin Hooks, who flew to Nashville and told him the movie's plot and tone. Akins felt that the movie "was going to be high energy", so he made his rendition "a pretty rockin' track, real edgy".

Critical reception
Deborah Evans Price of Billboard panned Akins' cover, saying that "Akins delivery doesn't have the zip and punch of Rabbitt's energetic version, and the production sounds like a watered-down version of the original."

Charts

References

Works cited
Bronson, Fred, The Billboard Book of Number One Hits 5th ed. Billboard Publications, New York, 2003. .
Roland, Tom, The Billboard Book of Number One Country Hits, Billboard Books, Watson-Guptill Publications, New York, 1991
Whitburn, Joel, "Top Pop Singles: 1955-2006," 2007.

1980 songs
1980 singles
1998 singles
Eddie Rabbitt songs
Rhett Akins songs
Songs written by Eddie Rabbitt
Songs written by David Malloy
Song recordings produced by David Malloy
Elektra Records singles
Decca Records singles
Songs written by Even Stevens (songwriter)
Song recordings produced by Frank Liddell
Song recordings produced by Greg Droman
Songs about truck driving